This is a list of senior officers of the Royal Navy (or more precisely a list of lists of the holders of certain senior positions in the Royal Navy).

Lord Admirals of England 1385 –1628, 1638 –1708
See Lord High Admirals

Lord High Admirals of Great Britain 1708 – 1709
See Lord High Admirals

Lord High Admirals of the United Kingdom 1827 –1828, 1964 –present
See Lord High Admirals

Vice Admirals of England 1410 – 1707
See Vice-Admiral of England

Vice Admirals of Great Britain 1707 – 1801
See Vice-Admiral of Great Britain

Vice Admirals of the United Kingdom 1801 – present
See Vice-Admiral of the United Kingdom

Rear Admirals of England 1683 – 1707 

See Rear-Admiral of England

Rear Admirals of Great Britain 1707 – 1801 

See Rear-Admiral of Great Britain

Rear Admirals of the United Kingdom 1801 – 2007 

See Rear-Admiral of the United Kingdom

Vice Admirals of the Coast of Great Britain and Ireland 1536 to 19th c.

See Vice-Admiral of the Coast.

First Lords of the Admiralty, 1628– present
See First Lord of the Admiralty

Admirals of the South, North and West, 1360-1369
See Admiral of the South, North and West

Admirals of the Fleet, 1690–present
See Admiral of the Fleet

Senior Naval Lord, 1689–1771
See First Sea Lord

First Naval Lords, 1771–1904
See First Sea Lord

First Sea Lord, 1904–1917
See First Sea Lord

First Sea Lords and Chiefs of the Naval Staff, 1917–present
See First Sea Lord and Chief of Naval Staff

Deputy First Sea Lords 1917 to 1946
See: Deputy First Sea Lord

Commander-in-Chief Fleet, 1971–2012
See Commander-in-Chief Fleet

Fleet Commander, 2012–present
See Fleet Commander

Second Naval Lords, 1830–1904
See Second Naval Lord

Second Sea Lords, 1904–1995
See Second Sea Lord

Second Sea Lords and Commanders-in-Chief Naval Home Command, 1995–2012
See Second Sea Lord and Commander-in-Chief Naval Home Command

Second Sea Lords and Chiefs of Naval Personnel and Training, 2012–2015
See Second Sea Lord and Chief of Naval Personnel and Training

Second Sea Lord and Deputy Chief of the Naval Staff, 2015–present
See Second Sea Lord and Deputy Chief of Naval Staff

Third Naval Lords 1832–1868
See Third Naval Lord

Third Naval Lords and Controllers of the Navy 1869–1872, 1882-1904
See Third Naval Lord and Controller of the Navy

Controllers of the Navy, 1872-1882, 1917-1918, 1965–present
See Controller of the Navy

Third Sea Lord and Controllers of the Navy 1904–1912, 1918-1965
See Third Sea Lord and Controller of the Navy

Third Sea Lord, 1912-1918
See Third Sea Lord

Fourth Naval Lords 1830–1868
See Fourth Naval Lord

Junior Naval Lords 1868-1904
See Junior Naval Lord

Fourth Sea Lords 1904–1964
See Fourth Sea Lord

Chiefs of Fleet Support 1964–2007
See Chief of Fleet Support

Chiefs of Materiel (Fleet)/Chief of Fleet (Support) 2007 – present
See Chief of Materiel (Fleet)/Chief of Fleet (Support)

Fifth Sea Lords and Chief of Naval Air Service 1917–1918
See Fifth Sea Lord and Chief of Naval Air Service

Fifth Sea Lords 1938–1956
See Fifth Sea Lord

Fifth Sea Lords and Deputy Chiefs of the Naval Staff 1957–1965
See Fifth Sea Lord and Deputy Chief of the Naval Staff

Deputy Chiefs of the Naval Staff
See Deputy Chief of the Naval Staff

Vice Chiefs of the Naval Staff

See Vice Chief of the Naval Staff

Assistant Chiefs of the Naval Staff
See Assistant Chief of the Naval Staff

References